Altedo is a frazione of the comune of Malalbergo in the Metropolitan City of Bologna in the Emilia-Romagna region of Italy.

Geography 
Altedo is  Malalbergo in the direction of Bologna. The State Road 64 Porrettana crosses the frazione. In the immediate vicinity of Altedo is the same-named exit of the Autostrada A13.

Monuments and places of interest

Religious architecture 
 Church of St. John the Baptist, parish church

Economy 
Altedo is known for the green asparagus of Altedo (Protected Geographical Indication). The Altedo asparagus must be produced exclusively in the Metropolitan City of Bologna and the province of Ferrara. Every year, on the third and fourth Sunday of May, the green asparagus festival is held in Altedo.

References

External links

Frazioni of the Province of Bologna